Neli Marinova Nešić (born ) is a retired Bulgarian female volleyball player.

She was part of the Bulgaria women's national volleyball team at the 1998 FIVB Volleyball Women's World Championship in Japan,
and at the 2002 FIVB Volleyball Women's World Championship in Germany. 
As of 2002, she played for Romaneli.

References

1971 births
Living people
Bulgarian women's volleyball players
Place of birth missing (living people)
Setters (volleyball)